Fraskanjel is a village in the municipality of Ulcinj, southeastern Montenegro. It is located on the west bank of Bojana (Buna), east of Lake Šas. It's one of the smallest villages of Ulcinj with 57 inhabitants, all but one Albanians.

References 

Populated places in Ulcinj Municipality
Albanian communities in Montenegro